Shifty Records was a South African anti-apartheid record label founded by Lloyd Ross and Ivan Kadey in 1982/3, which existed for around ten years.

History
Lloyd Ross and Ivan Kadey established Shifty records in 1983 or 1983.

In 1986 Kadey left South Africa and became partner with the Waterland Design Group in Hollywood, designing studios at Capitol Records, Virgin Tokyo, and many other recording venues. At this time Warrick Sony bought in as partner with the purchase of recording equipment.

, a Swedish non-governmental cultural organisation financially supported Shifty Records from 1986 to 1992 and held various events in Sweden for the company and the various artists associated with Shifty.

Lloyd began making music videos for some of the musicians, and then moved into documentary filmmaking in the mid 1990s, including the award-winning feature film The Silver Fez (2009).

Description 
Aimed at providing a platform for independent music with a social message, Shifty was an outlet for South African musicians opposed to apartheid. As a result, Shifty struggled to gain exposure on the radio stations of the Broederbond-controlled South African Broadcasting Corporation. Its anti-establishment stance was appealing to young and politically marginalised South Africans. This was evident when poet Mzwakhe Mbuli's unadvertised Change is Pain went gold after the apartheid regime banned possession and distribution of the album.

Significance 
The label helped establish boerepunk and the alternative Afrikaans genre at a time when it was a reflex to stereotype all Afrikaners as supporters of the National Party. Operating from a caravan hitched to a Ford V6 truck, the Shifty studio produced an album every two months until 1993.

Apartheid security campaign against Shifty (2002)
In 2002, notorious Bureau of State Security agent, Paul Erasmus was granted amnesty by the Truth & Reconciliation Commission for his overzealous campaign against Shifty Records artist, Roger Lucey, a campaign which ended his career. The amnesty application does not apply to other artists, appearing with Lucey, or released on the Shifty label. In particular, Lucey appears on Shifty compilation albums such as Forces Favourites and Anaartjie in our Sosatie. Erasmus claims in his biography to have waged a total war against the music industry. He is also one of Lucey's biggest fans, having confiscated most of his albums from record stores. The entire episode is documented in Stopping the Music: The Roger Lucey Story.

Artists
Shifty Records often made use of a core group of musicians who appeared on different artists' recordings as support instrumentalists, e.g. drummer Ian Herman and trombonist Jannie "Hanepoot" van Tonder who can both be heard on many albums from the Shifty Catalogue.

Artists appearing on the label included:

Vusi Mahlasela
Mzwakhe Mbuli
Koos Kombuis
The Genuines
FOSATU Workers Choirs
Isja
James Phillips & The Cherry Faced Lurchers
Bernoldus Niemand en Die Swart Gevaar, AKA James Phillips
Corporal Punishment
Jennifer Ferguson
Johannes Kerkorrel
Kalahari Surfers
National Wake
Noise Khanyile
Roger Lucey
Sankomota
Simba Morri
Tananas
Lesego Rampolokeng
Happy Ships
Winston's Jive Mixup
Robin Auld
KOOS

See also
 List of record labels
 Artists United Against Apartheid
 Market Theatre (Johannesburg)
 Music of South Africa
 Recommended Records and Rock in Opposition
 United Democratic Front
 The Voëlvry Movement

References

External links
 Shifty

South African independent record labels
Record labels established in 1983